Xiaonan Ma  (born 1972) is a Chinese mathematician working in global analysis and local index theory.

Career

Xiaonan Ma obtained his Bachelor-Diploma from the University of Wuhan and received his Ph.D. in 1998 under the direction of Jean-Michel Bismut at the  University of Paris-Sud with a thesis entitled Formes de torsion analytique et familles de submersions.  He was a researcher at the French National Centre for Scientific Research CNRS from 2001 to 2007, working at the Centre de Mathématiques Laurent Schwartz of the École Polytechnique. After the habilitation in 2005 (Théorie de l'indice local et applications) he became a professor at the University Paris VII (Denis Diderot) in 2007.

Xiaonan Ma had a postdoctoral position in the group of Jochen Brüning at the Humboldt University of Berlin and was visiting Professor at the University of California, Santa Cruz.  He was junior member of the Institut universitaire de France from 2009 to 2014.  He is member of the international Faculty of the University of Cologne.

Research

The research themes of Xiaonan Ma encompass global analysis and local Atiyah–Singer–index theory (analytic Ray–Singer torsion, Eta forms,
elliptic genera), Bergman kernels and geometric quantization.  He is editor of Science in China A (Mathematics) and of International Journal of Mathematics.

Awards

Xiaonan Ma was awarded together with George Marinescu the Ferran Sunyer i Balaguer Prize in 2006 for the book "Holomorphic Morse inequalities and Bergman kernels".  He was an invited speaker at the International Congress of Mathematicians in Hyderabad 2010 (Geometric quantization on Kähler and symplectic Manifolds).
Xiaonan Ma received in 2017 the Sophie Germain Prize.

Works

Books
with G. Marinescu: Holomorphic Morse inequalities and Bergman kernels, Birkhäuser, Progress in Mathematics 254, 2007. 
with W. Zhang: Bergman kernels and symplectic reduction, Astérisque, tome 318, 2008. 
editor with X. Dai, R. Léandre, W. Zhang: From Probability to Geometry. Volume in honor of the 60th birthday of Jean-Michel Bismut, 2 vols., Astérisque 327, 328, 2009. 
editor with Jean-Benoit Bost, Helmut Hofer, Francois Labourie, Yves Le Jan, Weiping Zhang: Geometry, analysis and probability – in honor of Jean-Michel Bismut,  Progress in Mathematics 310, Birkhäuser 2017.

Articles

References

External links 
Homepage

1972 births
Living people
20th-century Chinese mathematicians
21st-century Chinese mathematicians
Wuhan University alumni